Żydowo may refer to the following places:

Żydowo, Gniezno County in Greater Poland Voivodeship (west-central Poland)
Żydowo, Kościan County (German: Seide) in Greater Poland Voivodeship (west-central Poland)
Żydowo, Kuyavian-Pomeranian Voivodeship (north-central Poland)
Żydowo, Poznań County in Greater Poland Voivodeship (west-central Poland)
Żydowo, Września County in Greater Poland Voivodeship (west-central Poland)
Żydowo, Lubusz Voivodeship (German: Elisenfelde) (west Poland)
Żydowo, Warmian-Masurian Voivodeship (German: Siddau) (north Poland)
Żydowo, Koszalin County (German: Sydow) in West Pomeranian Voivodeship (north-west Poland)
Żydowo, Myślibórz County (German: Siede) in West Pomeranian Voivodeship (north-west Poland)

See also 
 Lubicz coat of arms